Beni Hasan (also written as Bani Hasan, or also Beni-Hassan) is an ancient Egyptian cemetery.

While there are some Old Kingdom burials at the site, it was primarily used during the Middle Kingdom, spanning the 21st to 17th centuries BCE (Middle Bronze Age).

To the south of the cemetery is  a temple constructed by Hatshepsut and Thutmose III, dedicated to the local goddess Pakhet. It is known as the Cave of Artemis, because the Greeks identified Pakhet with Artemis, and the temple is subterranean.

Cemetery
Provincial governors in the Middle Kingdom continued to be buried in decorated rock-cut tombs in their local cemeteries, carried over from the First Intermediate Period, at sites such as Beni Hasan. There is evidence of a reorganization of the system of government during the 12th Dynasty. During the First Intermediate Period and for some of the Middle Kingdom period it was common for nomarchs (someone who oversees/controls a government specified area) to be hereditary positions; the elite did not depend on the king to legitimize their power as much as they had in the Old Kingdom.  In the 12th Dynasty the power of the nomarchs began to be curtailed, and provincial governors were appointed or at least confirmed by the king.

There are 39 ancient tombs here of Middle Kingdom (ca. 21st to 19th centuries BCE) nomarchs of the Oryx nome, who governed from Hebenu. Due to the quality of, and distance to the cliffs in the west, these tombs were constructed on the east bank. There is a spatial distribution in this cemetery (there are two cemeteries here: the upper range and the lower necropolis) associated with the different levels of resources available to the deceased; the most important people were buried near the top of the cliff. In the lower cemetery there are 888 shaft tombs, dating to the Middle Kingdom, that were excavated by John Garstang; for the most part these tombs shared a similar general design which included a small chamber or recess at the foot of the shaft (facing south) to receive the coffin and the funeral deposits.

In the upper cemetery members of the elite class built striking tombs to represent their social and political positions as the rulers and officials of the Oryx Nome, which is the 16th Nome of Upper Egypt. At this site, the provincial high elite were buried in large and elaborately decorated tombs carved into the limestone cliffs near the provincial capital, located in the upper cemetery area. These tombs lie in a row on a north–south axis. There is a slight break in the natural rock terrace, on to which they open, that divides the thirty-nine high status tombs into two groups. The basic design of these elite tombs was an outer court and a rock-cut pillared room (sometimes referred to as the chapel) in which there was a shaft that led to the burial chamber.

Some of the larger tombs have biographical inscriptions and were painted with scenes of daily life and warfare. They are famous for the quality of their paintings.  Nowadays, many of these scenes are in poor condition, though in the 19th century copies were made of several of them.  Howard Carter as a teenager 1891 spent a season painting watercolours of some of them

Notable tombs

Four out of the 39 tombs are accessible to the public. Notable tombs are:

Tomb 2 – Amenemhat, known as Ameny, nomarch under Senusret I (accessible).
Tomb 3 – Khnumhotep II, notable for the depiction of caravans of Semitic traders (accessible).
Tomb 4 – Khnumhotep IV, nomarch during the late 12th Dynasty (closed).
Tomb 13 – Khnumhotep, royal scribe during the 12th Dynasty (closed).
Tomb 14 – Khnumhotep I, nomarch under Amenemhat I (closed).
Tomb 15 – Baqet III, notable for the depiction of wrestling techniques (accessible).
Tomb 17 – Khety, nomarch during the 11th Dynasty, son of Baqet; notable for depiction of what may be ball games (accessible).
Tomb 21 – Nakht, nomarch during the 12th Dynasty (closed).
Tomb 23 – Netjernakht, overseer of the Eastern Desert during the 12th dynasty (closed).
Tomb 27 – Ramushenti, nomarch during the 11th Dynasty (closed).
Tomb 29 – Baqet I, nomarch during the 11th Dynasty (closed).
Tomb 33 – Baqet II, nomarch during the 11th Dynasty (closed).

See also
 List of ancient Egyptian towns and cities

References

Further reading
Newberry, Percy E., Beni Hasan. Part I–IV. London, England: Kegan Paul, Trench, Tubner & Co., Ltd., 1893–1900.

External links

Cemeteries in Egypt
Tombs of ancient Egypt
Buildings and structures of the Eleventh Dynasty of Egypt
Buildings and structures of the Twelfth Dynasty of Egypt